Arthur Sanders Way (13 February 1847 – 25 September 1930), was a classical scholar, translator and headmaster of Wesley College, Melbourne, Australia.

Arthur Way, son of the Rev. William Way and his wife Matilda, née Francis, was born at Dorking, England. He was educated at Kingswood School, Bath, and graduated M.A. at University of London. From 1870 to 1876 he was classical lecturer at Queen's College, Taunton, vice-master of Kingswood School, 1876 to 1881, and in 1882 became headmaster of Wesley College, Melbourne. He had already published his translation of the Odyssey of Homer, and while at Wesley brought out his translation of the Iliad. (See English translations of Homer#WayIl.)

At Wesley he fostered the teaching of natural science, and also brought in the teaching of commercial principles for boys likely to pursue a business career, but the number of students went down during his period, largely because of the financial depression which began in 1889. He resigned in 1892 and spent most of the rest of his life in translating from the classics. The list of his translations in Miller's Australian Literature includes the Odyssey; the Iliad; works of Euripides, Aeschylus, and Sophocles; the Epodes of Horace; Vergil's Georgics; the Nibelungenlied; the Chanson de Roland; works of Theocritus, Bion, and Moschus; the New Testament Biblical letters of Paul and Hebrews entitled, The Letters of St. Paul to Seven Churches and Three Friends with The Letter to the Hebrews; works of Aristophanes, Hesiod, Lucretius, and others. Way was also the author of Homer (1913), Greek through English (1926), and Sons of the Violet-Crowned, a Tale of Ancient Athens (1929).

Way had been president of the Melbourne Shakespeare Society and a councillor of the Royal Society of Victoria.
Way died at Ventnor, Isle of Wight, on 25 September 1930.

References

Sources

External links

 
 
 

1847 births
1930 deaths
English classical scholars
People educated at Kingswood School, Bath
Australian headmasters
People from Dorking
Greek–English translators
German–English translators
French–English translators
Latin–English translators
English male poets
Translators of Ancient Greek texts
Translators of Homer
Translators of Virgil
English emigrants to colonial Australia
Wesley College (Victoria)